The UNC Pembroke Braves football team represents the University of North Carolina at Pembroke in college football, competing in the Mountain East Conference. Pembroke plays its home games at the 4,000 seat Grace P. Johnson Stadium at Lumbee Guaranty Bank Field, which is located on-campus in Pembroke, North Carolina. Although only fielding a modern team since the 2007 season, Pembroke previously fielded teams between the 1946 and 1950 seasons as Pembroke State.

History
Pembroke State fielded their first team in 1946. Having played only five games in the inaugural season, James Sampson served as head coach. Sampson served as head coach through the termination of the football program following the 1950 season.

Without sanctioned football since the 1950 season, on December 1, 2004, the UNC Pembroke Board of Trustees voted unanimously to proceed with the development of a football program to begin play by the 2007 season. With stadium expansion complete by summer 2005, Pembroke announced the hiring of Pete Shinnick as the reinstated program's head coach on December 13, 2005. With the team in place, the Braves lost their inaugural game on the road to the Davidson Wildcats 31–21 on September 1, and notched their first win in their first home game after they defeated Greensboro College 26–20 on September 8 en route to completing the 2007 campaign with a 4–7 record.

Pembroke improved upon their 2007 record through and finished the 2008 season with a record of 9–1. The 2008 squad featured a defense that lead all of Division II in scoring defense that only allowed 11.20 points per game; was second in total defense with 226.60 yards per game; and was fourth in rushing defense with 71.60 yards per game.

In 2017, Pembroke entered into a scheduling alliance with the South Atlantic Conference. The agreement was originally set to run through the 2020 season, but Pembroke ended the agreement a year early after reaching a larger agreement on associate membership with the Mountain East Conference (MEC). Under the MEC agreement, Pembroke became an associate member in all five of the school's varsity sports that are not sponsored by its full-time home of the Peach Belt Conference, including football.

Seasons

Rivalries
While Pembroke was not a football member of any conference before 2020, they do share a rivalry with geographically close schools, such as the Fayetteville State University and Wingate University.

Fayetteville State and Pembroke are separated by only , with the rivalry named for the Lumber River near Pembroke and the Cape Fear River near Fayetteville, NC. Both schools square off for bragging rights, as many of the players on both teams come from the surrounding Robeson, Cumberland, Richmond, Scotland, Hoke and Moore counties.

One of Pembroke's first games in 2007 was against Wingate, and they have played every year since.

References

External links
 

 
American football teams established in 2007
2007 establishments in North Carolina